Frumușani is a commune located in the proximity of Bucharest, Romania, 15 kilometers to the southeast on the National Road to Oltenița (DN4), just after Popești-Leordeni. Part of Călărași County, in the historical region of Muntenia, it is composed of six villages: Frumușani, Orăști, Pasărea, Pădurișu, Pițigaia and Postăvari.

The access is quite easy, because of a good quality National Road and the Bucharest belt nearby and the traffic is not crowded. The landscape is quite picturesque, thanks to an imposing forest and lakes.

The zone was not so developed in the past like the neighboring villages within the same area and comparable distance from Bucharest (Glina, Brănești, Berceni, Jilava), due to its belonging to Călărași County, quite a poor one. Lately important investments appeared in this area. Tnuva milk factory started its activity in 2006 and several real-estate residences are in developing process (Allegria).

References

Communes in Călărași County
Localities in Muntenia